Alli Arjuna is a 1935 Indian Tamil-language Hindu mythological film produced and directed by A. V. Meiyappan in his debut. It is based on the play of the same name, revolving around Arjuna from the Hindu epic Mahabharata. The film stars K. S. Ananthanarayana Iyer and K. R. Kanthimathi Bai, and became a box-office bomb.

Cast 
 K. S. Ananthanarayana Iyer
 K. R. Kanthimathi Bai

Production 
In 1934, A. V. Meiyappan established Saraswathi Sound Productions. The debut venture of this company would be launched a year later, titled Alli Arjuna, an adaptation of the play of the same name that revolved around Arjuna from the Hindu epic Mahabharata. Theatre actors K. S. Ananthanarayana Iyer and K. R. Kanthimathi Bai were cast as the lead pair. Due to lack of proper studio facilities in Madras to shoot sound films, Alli Arjuna had to be shot at the Calcutta-based New Theatres Studios.

Soundtrack 
Although Tamil films in the early 1930s had multiple songs, some having as many as 40 or 50, Meiyappan minimised the usage of songs in Alli Arjuna as he felt "a film could be made with new faces or less expensive artistes and with lesser number of songs".

Release and reception 
Alli Arjuna was released in 1935 and became a box-office bomb. Historian Randor Guy attributed the film's failure to various reasons, including the cast performances and the high budget.

References 

Hindu mythological films
Hindu devotional films
Indian films based on plays
Films based on the Mahabharata
1930s Tamil-language films